Milla-Maj Majasaari (born 15 October 1999) is a Finnish football goalkeeper who plays for AIK in the Swedish Damallsvenskan and the Finland national team. She has previously played in the Kansallinen Liiga at NiceFutis, TPS and FC Honka.

Club career
Majasaari started his career at NiceFutis in Pori. She played her first Naisten Liga match with NiceFutis at the age of 14 in the Autumn of 2014. From 2016 to 2018, Majasaari played in TPS, which won the 2016 Naisten Liga silver. For the 2019 season, Majasaari moved to FC Honka, which placed second in the Naisten Liga during that season.

In December 2019, Majasaari signed a contract with AIK, who played in the Sweden second tier division Elitettan. In her first Swedish season, Majasaari played full minutes in all AIK matches and had 13 clean sheets. She was chosen as the best goalkeeper of the Elitettan season. The season ended with a victory for AIK and a promotion to Damallsvenskan. In November 2020, she signed a three-year extension with AIK. She played her first league match in Damallsvenskan on 17 April 2021.

International career
Majasaari has represented Finland in the of U-16, U-17, U-18 and U-19 teams and in the women's U-23 national team. She played his first international match at the age of 14 on the U-16 national team against Iceland in the summer of 2014. Majasaari participated in the Euro 2022 qualifier against Scotland for the first time in October 2020 with the Finnish national team, in which she was called to replace the injured Paula Myllyoja.

Honours

Club 
AIK
Winners
 Elitettan: 2020

References

External links 
 

1999 births
Living people
Sportspeople from Pori
Finnish women's footballers
Finland women's youth international footballers
Finland women's international footballers
Women's association football goalkeepers
Finnish expatriate footballers
Expatriate women's footballers in Sweden
Finnish expatriate sportspeople in Sweden
NiceFutis players
Turun Palloseura (women's football) players
FC Honka (women) players
AIK Fotboll (women) players
Damallsvenskan players
Elitettan players